United Nations Security Council Resolution 2199 was unanimously approved on 12 February 2015 to combat terrorism. Drafted by Russia, its legally binding provisions gave the fifteen nations of the United Nations Security Council authority to enforce decisions with economic sanctions. The resolution, in particular, emphasized "the need to combat by all means, in accordance with the Charter of the United Nations and international law, [...] threats to international peace and security caused by terrorist acts".

Provisions
Resolution 2199 highlighted several financial measures to fight terrorism, such as asset freezing and closure of all financial sources of terrorism, including illegal drug trade and extraction of natural resources by terrorists. The resolution also noted that the provisions of Resolution 2161 unconditionally ban the payment of ransom to terrorist groups in exchange for hostages. The resolution also condemned the destruction of cultural heritage by ISIL and the Al-Nusrah Front.

Under Resolution 2199 UN member states must report within 120 days to the Al-Qaida Sanctions Committee on their compliance with the resolution. The resolution also asked the United Nations counter-terrorism bodies to supervise progress on the document's implementation.

References

External links
Text of the Resolution at undocs.org

 2199
 2199
February 2015 events